Johan Antonio Mendivil González (born April 22, 1994, in Ahome, Sinaloa) is a Mexican professional footballer who currently plays for Murciélagos F.C.

References

External links
 

1994 births
Living people
Mexican footballers
Dorados de Sinaloa footballers
Murciélagos FC footballers
Liga MX players
Ascenso MX players
Liga Premier de México players
Footballers from Sinaloa
People from Ahome Municipality
Association football defenders